Narajole Mahendra Academy,  is one of the oldest school located in Narajole, Paschim Medinipur, West Bengal, India. This school was established in 1894. It is a co-ed Higher Secondary School.

The school follows the course curricula of West Bengal Board of Secondary Education (WBBSE) and West Bengal Council of Higher Secondary Education (WBCHSE) for Standard 10th and 12th Board examinations respectively.

References

High schools and secondary schools in West Bengal
Schools in Paschim Medinipur district
Educational institutions established in 1894
1894 establishments in India